Lapham may refer to:

People
Bill Lapham (1934–2016), American football player
Dave Lapham (born 1952), former player and current announcer for the NFL Cincinnati Bengals
David Lapham (born 1970), cartoonist
Elbridge G. Lapham (1814–1890), New York politician
Increase A. Lapham (1811–1875), nineteenth century author and scientist
Lewis H. Lapham (born 1935), contemporary writer
Nathan Lapham (1820–1890), New York politician
Robert Lapham American guerrilla in the Philippines during WWII
Roger Lapham (1883–1966), businessman and politician
Seneca Lapham, a fictional character in the list of Cthulhu Mythos biographies
Silas Lapham, the protagonist of William Dean Howells' novel The Rise of Silas Lapham
Smith Lapham, an early settler of Rockford, Michigan

Places

United States 
Lapham, former name of Stateline, California
Lapham Peak Unit, Kettle Moraine State Forest, Wisconsin state park
Lapham Memorial, public artwork on the University of Wisconsin–Milwaukee campus
Lapham Mills, a hamlet northeast of Peru, New York 
Lapham Institute, from 1863 to 1876 the name of what is now the Smithville Seminary, a Free Will Baptist institution in Rhode Island